Étienne Chavannes (Cap Haïtien, 1939) is a Haitian painter. Chavannes typically paints crowd scenes, such as religious celebrations, funerals, and sports events. In 1978, his works were exhibited at the Brooklyn Museum in New York City.

References

 

1939 births
Haitian painters
Haitian male painters
Living people
People from Cap-Haïtien